Dear Jane, I... is a Toronto, Ontario, Canada, based band that was formed in early 2003. The band's current members include Jeremy Dove (vocals), James Wells (guitar/vocals), Kat Lucas (guitar/vocals), Mark Cohene (bass guitar) and Neil Uppal (drums).

Their first EP, released independently in 2004, is Don't Know How to Begin. The video for their single "Stayed Up All Night" was in rotation on MuchLOUD and on MusiquePlus.

The band is currently signed to the Oakville, Ontario, based record label Verona Records (owned and operated by Shane Told of the band Silverstein). They have released one full-length album through the label, entitled Hope This Reaches You In Time (produced by Julius Butty), which reached No. 183 on the Canadian Billboard Top 200 chart for its first week of sales. The video for their single, "Wish Black Wishes", was not accepted for rotation on MuchMusic, but remained viewable online at their website and on YouTube.

Despite numerous line-up changes, the band continued to tour and promote their first full-length album throughout 2006-2007. The band stopped performing in mid-2007 after the continuous line-up changes proved difficult for the original members.

Founding member Neil Uppal currently plays in the Toronto-based band Breached, and fill-in guitarist Kat Lucas is currently playing guitar and keyboards for Pink.

Discography

Albums

Singles

References

External links 
 Dear Jane, I... official site
 Verona Records official site
 "Stayed Up All Night" music video (YouTube)
 "Wish Black Wishes" music video (YouTube)

Canadian punk rock groups